During the 1996–97 English football season, Millwall F.C. competed in the Football League Second Division.

Season summary
In the 1996–97 season, Millwall had a tough finish to the campaign after being top of the table at the beginning of December which included a poor run of just five wins from their remaining 26 league games that saw them plummet down the table and ended up finishing in a disappointing 14th place. The club also experienced extreme financial difficulties that resulted in them being placed in financial administration for a short time. Jimmy Nicholl was relieved of his duties in February and John Docherty returned on a short term basis to stabilise the club at playing level.

Final league table

Results
Millwall's score comes first

Legend

Football League Second Division

FA Cup

League Cup

Football League Trophy

Squad

References

Millwall F.C. seasons
Millwall